Tom Christian Gulager (born July 21, 1965) is an American actor. He is the son of actors Clu Gulager and Miriam Byrd-Nethery and brother of actor/director John Gulager. He is best known for his roles in his brother's film series Feast, while in The Candidate he appeared alongside Meghan Markle.

Selected filmography
 Gunfighter (1998) as Jimmy/Bar 20 Rider
 Clockmaker (1998) as Bankwell
 Palmer's Pick Up (1999) as Mr. Remo
 Dodge Alley (2002) as Rem
 Vic (2006) as Tony LaSalle
 Feast II: Sloppy Seconds (2008) as Greg Swank
 Feast III: The Happy Finish (2009) as Greg Swank
 The Collector (2009) as Cop #1
 The Candidate (2010) as Burton Grunzer
 White Knight (2011) as Prison Guard

References

External links
 

1965 births
American male film actors
American male television actors
Living people
20th-century American male actors
21st-century American male actors
Male actors from Los Angeles